The Men's 400 metre freestyle competition of the 2020 European Aquatics Championships was held on 17 May 2021.

Records
Before the competition, the existing world, European and championship records were as follows.

Results

Heats
The heats were started at 10:14.

Final
The final was held at 18:09.

References

External links

Men's 400 metre freestyle